Augüera'l Coutu is one of 54 parishes in Cangas del Narcea, a municipality within the province and autonomous community of Asturias, in northern Spain.

Villages
Augüera'l Coutu
Cieḷḷa
Casería
Los Chanos del Coutu
Ḷḷubeiru
Penas
Ratu
Santiagu de Penas

References 

Parishes in Cangas del Narcea